Vörös Meteor Egyetértés SK was a Hungarian football club from Budapest.

History
Vörös Meteor Egyetértés SK debuted in the 1921–22 season of the Hungarian League and finished twelfths.

Name Changes 
1907–?: Egyetértés Sport Club
?-1940: Egyetértés AC
? – 1940
1945–1951: Egyetértés Sport Club
1951–1952: Vörös Meteor Egyetértés SK
1952: merger with Vörös Meteor Nemzeti Bank SK
1953: reestablished
1953–1956: Vörös Meteor Vendéglátóipari SC
1956–1971: Egyetértés Sport Club
1972–1975: Vörös Meteor Egyetértés Sport Klub
1975: merger with MTK Budapest FC

Managers
 Károly Lakat

External links
 Profile

References

Football clubs in Hungary